Wong Chuk Hang Road is a major thoroughfare in Hong Kong Island. It is part of Hong Kong's Route 1. It is a 6-lane major thoroughfare.

Wong Chuk Hang Road connects Aberdeen Praya Road and Aberdeen Tunnel.

Flyover
The construction for the flyover cost 358 million Hong Kong dollars. Construction began in October 1998, and ended in December 2001.

Interchanges
The section of Route 1 that runs through Wong Chuk Hang Road has 4 exits. They are numbered 1A, 2, 3, and 4. The entire road is in Wong Chuk Hang, Southern District.
{| class="plainrowheaders wikitable"
|-
|colspan=4 bgcolor="#f2f2f2" style="text-align:center"|Wong Chuk Hang Road
|-
!scope=col|km
!scope=col|Exit
!scope=col|Destinations
!scope=col|Notes
|-
|style="text-align:right"|0.0
|style="text-align:center"|
|Aberdeen Praya Road - Aberdeen
|Southern terminus; end of 
|-
|style="text-align:right"|0.1
|style="text-align:center"|1
|Ap Lei Chau Bridge Road - Ap Lei Chau
|Northbound exit and southbound entrance from and to Aberdeen Praya Road
|-
|style="text-align:right"|0.2
|bgcolor="#ffdddd" style="text-align:center"|1A
|bgcolor="#ffdddd"|Heung Yip Road
|bgcolor="#ffdddd"|Southbound exit and entrance only
|-
|style="text-align:right"|0.7
|style="text-align:center"|2
|Nam Long Shan Road - Wong Chuk Hang
|
|-
|style="text-align:right"|1.2
|style="text-align:center"|3
|Ocean Park Road - Ocean Park, Nam Long Shan
|
|-
|style="text-align:right"|1.6
|bgcolor="#ffdddd" style="text-align:center"|4
|bgcolor="#ffdddd"|Island Road / Nam Fung Road - Repulse Bay, Shouson Hill, Stanley; Wong Nai Chung Gap
|bgcolor="#ffdddd"|Southbound exit and northbound entrance limited to only Island Road
|-
|style="text-align:right"|2.3
|bgcolor="#dcdcfe" style="text-align:center"|
|bgcolor="#dcdcfe"| Aberdeen Tunnel - North Point, Central, Wan Chai, Kowloon & Causeway Bay
|bgcolor="#dcdcfe"|Happy Valley terminus;  continues

References

Route 1 (Hong Kong)
Wong Chuk Hang
Roads on Hong Kong Island